Microsa is a genus of Caribbean ground spiders that was first described by Norman I. Platnick & M. U. Shadab in 1977.  it contains only three species: M. chickeringi, M. cubitas, and M. gertschi.

References

Araneomorphae genera
Gnaphosidae
Spiders of the Caribbean